Neil Cole (May 27, 1926 – February 16, 2016) was an American stock car racing driver who competed in 19 NASCAR Grand National events between 1950 and 1953. Cole finished his NASCAR career with 10 top tens and 1 career win, which came at Thompson Speedway in 1951.

Motorsports career results

NASCAR
(key) (Bold – Pole position awarded by qualifying time. Italics – Pole position earned by points standings or practice time. * – Most laps led.)

Grand National Series

References

External links
 

1926 births
2016 deaths
NASCAR drivers
People from Oakland, New Jersey
Racing drivers from New Jersey
Sportspeople from Bergen County, New Jersey